Davor Piškor (born 23 April 1982 in Zagreb) is a retired Croatian footballer who played as a striker.

Career
Piškor played the majority of his career in his native Croatia, but also had spells in Albania, Singapore and finished his career in Austria.

References

External links
 

1982 births
Living people
Footballers from Zagreb
Association football forwards
Croatian footballers
HNK Segesta players
NK Novalja players
NK Inter Zaprešić players
NK Međimurje players
NK Zagreb players
NK Zadar players
NK Croatia Sesvete players
KS Kastrioti players
Tampines Rovers FC players
First Football League (Croatia) players
Croatian Football League players
Kategoria Superiore players
Singapore Premier League players
Austrian 2. Landesliga players
Croatian expatriate footballers
Expatriate footballers in Albania
Croatian expatriate sportspeople in Albania
Expatriate footballers in Singapore
Croatian expatriate sportspeople in Singapore
Expatriate footballers in Austria
Croatian expatriate sportspeople in Austria